The NIS building is the headquarters building of Naftna Industrija Srbije (NIS), located in Novi Sad, Serbia.

History

Construction started in 1989 and finished in 1998. The building is one of the landmarks of Novi Sad. It is located in the city quarter known as Liman III, across from Liman Park, on Narodnog Fronta Street and Bulevar oslobođenja.

References

Buildings and structures in Novi Sad
Office buildings in Serbia
Yugoslav Serbian architecture